Bryce Joseph Thompson (born February 26, 2002) is an American college basketball player for the Oklahoma State Cowboys of the Big 12 Conference. He previously played for the Kansas Jayhawks. He was a consensus five-star recruit and one of the best shooting guards the 2020 class.

High school career
Thompson attended Booker T. Washington High School in Tulsa, Oklahoma and was coached by Conley Phipps. He led the team to two state runner-up finishes during his freshman and sophomore seasons. As a junior, Thompson led the Hornets to an Oklahoma State title and was named Gatorade Player of the Year. In the 2019 Under Armour Circuit, Thompson averaged 25.3 points per game for Oklahoma Run PWP. As a senior, Thompson averaged 25.1 points, 5.8 rebounds and 2.8 assists per game. He was named Oklahoma Gatorade Player of the Year for the second straight season and was also named a McDonald's All-American. Thompson finished his high school career with 1,945 points.

Recruiting
Thompson was ranked the 20th best prospect and top prospect in Oklahoma in his class by 247Sports. He committed to playing college basketball for Kansas on November 12, 2019, choosing the Jayhawks over offers from Oklahoma State, Oklahoma, and North Carolina. Thompson chose Kansas due to the history of winning and his relationship with coach Bill Self.

College career
Thompson missed 10 games during his freshman season due to a back injury and broken right index finger. He averaged 4.6 points, 1.5 rebounds and 1.1 assists per game. Following the season he transferred to Oklahoma State.

Career statistics

College

|-
| style="text-align:left;"| 2020–21
| style="text-align:left;"| Kansas
| 20 || 4 || 17.1 || .353 || .222 || .647 || 1.5 || 1.1 || .4 || .2 || 4.6
|-
| style="text-align:left;"| 2021–22
| style="text-align:left;"| Oklahoma State
| 29 || 25 || 26.1 || .413 || .290 || .667 || 2.3 || 1.1 || .6 || .1 || 10.6
|- class="sortbottom"
| style="text-align:center;" colspan="2"| Career
| 49 || 29 || 22.4 || .397 || .272 || .662 || 2.0 || 1.1 || .5 || .1 || 8.1

Personal life
Thompson's father Rod played basketball at Tulsa in the 1990s. His maternal grandfather Marshall Rogers played at Kansas during the 1972–73 season before transferring to Texas–Pan American. Oklahoma assistant coach Pooh Williamson is a family friend. Thompson speaks fluent French.

References

External links
Oklahoma State Cowboys bio
USA Basketball bio

2002 births
Living people
American men's basketball players
Basketball players from Oklahoma
Booker T. Washington High School (Tulsa, Oklahoma) alumni
Kansas Jayhawks men's basketball players
McDonald's High School All-Americans
Shooting guards
Sportspeople from Tulsa, Oklahoma